Shakespeare by the Sea was a summer outdoor event held at Balmoral Beach in Sydney's northern suburbs, using a band rotunda as a backdrop, that ran in summer (January to early March) for twenty-five seasons, from 1987 to 2011.

The event was started in 1987 by David MacSwan, pre-dating other similarly named events such as Shakespeare by the Sea, Halifax, which was founded in 1994. Each season featured two plays, mostly from Shakespeare's canon including, Henry IV (parts 1 and 2), Romeo and Juliet, King Lear, The Merchant of Venice, The Two Gentlemen of Verona, The Merry Wives of Windsor, The Comedy of Errors, Much Ado About Nothing, Macbeth, Othello, and Hamlet. In 2005 and 2010 Shakespeare by the Sea presented The Taming of the Shrew, with The Tamer Tamed by John Fletcher. The events were also noted for not charging any admission fees; instead, the audience was invited to make a donation at the conclusion of each performance.

Actors who have performed in Shakespeare by the Sea productions include Gregor Jordan, who played Bassanio in The Merchant of Venice and who later directed the films Two Hands (1999), Buffalo Soldiers (2001), and Ned Kelly (2003). Joe Clements who played Senior Sergeant Allan Steiger in the television soap opera, Neighbours, during 2004–2007 was in the 2010 productions of Shakespeare by the Sea.

The 2011 season was announced as the final season, even before the founder David MacSwan died suddenly on 14 January 2011, the opening night of the final season. Some of the actors who had been members of the Shakespeare by the Sea company decided to continue presenting plays at the same site and following a similar schedule, but with a different production style, under the name Bard on the Beach.

Shakespeare by the Sea (Australia) is listed as a Major Festival in the book Shakespeare Festivals Around the World by Marcus D. Gregio (Editor), 2004.

Past productions

 1986 A Midsummer Night's Dream and Twelfth Night
 1987 Romeo and Juliet and The Taming of the Shrew
 1988 The Merry Wives of Windsor and Macbeth
 1989 As You Like It and Much Ado About Nothing
 1990 Othello and Richard III
 1991 Henry IV parts 1 and 2
 1992 Henry V & The Merchant of Venice
 1993 The Comedy of Errors and Hamlet
 1994 The Two Gentlemen of Verona and The Tempest
 1996 The Comedy of Errors and Macbeth
 1997 Measure for Measure and Twelfth Night
 1998 King Lear
 2002 Romeo and Juliet and The Tempest
 2003 Hamlet and A Midsummer Night's Dream
 2004 Twelfth Night and The Comedy of Errors
 2005 The Taming of the Shrew and The Tamer Tamed
 2006 The Merchant of Venice and Much Ado About Nothing
 2007 The Merry Wives of Windsor and As You Like It
 2008 Richard III and Macbeth
 2009 Measure for Measure and Romeo and Juliet
 2010 The Taming of the Shrew and The Tamer Tamed
 2011 A Midsummer Night's Dream and The Comedy of Errors

References

  Armstrong, Maria. "Accessible theatre, if the tempest stays offshore ". The Sydney Morning Herald Northern Herald 13 Jan 1994 p. 11
  Freeman, Jane. "Bard's big outdoors ". The Sydney Morning Herald Metro 10 February 1995 p. 3
   "Bard at Balmoral now a hot property". The Sydney Morning Herald Northern Herald 28 August 1997 p. 2
  Lobley, Katrina. "Midsummer night's dream". The Sydney Morning Herald Metro 7 January 2005 p. 24
  Morgan, Clare . "Bard at the beach no more as company founder dies, 51". The Sydney Morning Herald 19 January 2011

External links
 Official website

Theatre companies in Australia
Festivals in Sydney
Shakespearean theatre companies
Theatre in Sydney